The  is a  railway line in Aichi Prefecture, Japan, operated by the private railway operator Nagoya Railroad (Meitetsu) connecting Umetsubo Station in Toyota with Akaike Station in Nisshin. The line operates a through-service onto the Nagoya Subway Tsurumai Line at Akaike.

Stations

History
First proposed in 1926, construction of the line was started by the Mikawa Railway in 1932, but abandoned in 1937 due to management issues. Construction restarted in 1973 following an agreement for through-running with the Nagoya Subway Tsurumai Line, and the line opened in 1979, dual-tracked and electrified at 1,500 V DC.

See also
 List of railway lines in Japan

References
This article incorporates material from the corresponding article in the Japanese Wikipedia

External links 

  
 

Toyota Line
Rail transport in Aichi Prefecture
1067 mm gauge railways in Japan
Railway lines opened in 1979